Christopher Joseph Bittle  (born February 17, 1979) is a Canadian Liberal politician who was elected to represent the riding of St. Catharines in the House of Commons of Canada in the 2015 federal election. He currently serves as the Parliamentary Secretary to the Minister of Environment and Climate Change, sitting on the Standing Committee on Environment and Sustainable Development. He previously served as Parliamentary Secretary to the Minister of Transport and as Deputy House Leader of the Government. Bittle is the youngest MP to hold the Deputy House Leader position in the House of Commons.

Early life and career

Born in Niagara Falls, Bittle graduated from St. Paul Catholic Secondary School before attending Queen's University where he graduated with an Honours Bachelor of Arts degree. He then attended law school at the University of Windsor where he received a Bachelor of Laws. Before he was elected Member of Parliament, he worked at Lancaster, Brooks and Welch LLP, as a civil litigator focusing in matters like commercial disputes, real state litigation defamation, and landlord tenant matters. In addition to practicing law Bittle also served as Chair of Quest Community Health Centre, a not-for-profit Community Health Centre in St. Catharines. Bittle also worked as an instructor in the Department of Continuing Education at Niagara College and as seminar leader at Brock University.

Political career 
Bittle was elected as a first time Member of Parliament in October 2015. He received 24,870 votes and defeated incumbent Rick Dykstra.

In September 2017, Bittle was appointed Deputy Leader of the Government in the House of Commons, the youngest Member of Parliament to hold that position. In December 2019, he was appointed Parliamentary Secretary to the Minister of Transport, where he worked alongside Minister Marc Garneau and Minister Omar Alghabra to invest in public transit and particularly on safe travel during the COVID-19 pandemic.

In March 2021, Bittle was appointed as Parliamentary Secretary to the Minister of the Environment and Climate Change, Jonathan Wilkinson. Bittle is also a member of the Standing Committee on Environment and Sustainable Development.

Bittle was re-elected as an Member of Parliament in the 2021 Canadian federal election but with a decreased share of the vote.

In August 2022 Bittle apologized to University of Ottawa law professor Michael Geist for accusing Geist of racism during a twitter dispute.

Electoral record

References

External links
 Official Website

1979 births
21st-century Canadian politicians
Living people
Liberal Party of Canada MPs
Members of the House of Commons of Canada from Ontario
Lawyers in Ontario
People from Niagara Falls, Ontario
Politicians from St. Catharines
Queen's University at Kingston alumni
University of Windsor alumni
University of Windsor Faculty of Law alumni